MSS may refer to:

Places 

 Manassas (Amtrak station) (station code), Virginia, US
 Massena International Airport (IATA code), New York, US
 Moses Gate railway station (National Rail station code), England

Organizations

Education 

 Canada

 Midland Secondary School

 China

 Marymount Secondary School, Hong Kong

 Singapore

 Marsiling Secondary School, a secondary school in Woodlands
 Meridian Secondary School, a secondary school in Pasir Ris
 Montfort Secondary School, a secondary school in Hougang

 United Kingdom and British Overseas Territories

 Monkton Combe School, near Bath, England (for Monkton Combe Senior School)
 Montserrat Secondary School, Salem, Montserrat (British Overseas Territory)

 United States

 Meskwaki Settlement School, Tama County, Iowa

 Other

 Master of Social Science, a postgraduate degree
 Master of Strategic Studies, awarded by military colleges such as Marine Corps University,

Other organizations 

 Ministry for State Security (disambiguation), multiple organizations
 Merseyside Skeptics Society, UK, for scientific scepticism
 The Mother's Service Society, a social science research institute in Pondicherry, India
 Manufacturers Standardization Society, an organization in the Valve and Fittings Industry
 MSS Security (see Chubb Fire & Security)
 Mladinski svet Slovenije, the national youth council of Slovenia

Science and technology

Computing 

 Managed security service, in outsourced networks
 Mass Storage System, the IBM 3850
 Maximum segment size, a TCP header parameter in computer networking
 Microsoft Search Server
 Miles Sound System, a sound software development kit for video games

Other science and technology 

 Marshall–Smith syndrome, characterized by unusual accelerated skeletal maturation
 Microsatellite stability, in genetics
 Multispectral Scanner, on Landsat satellites
 Mobile Servicing System, a robotic system on board the International Space Station
 Mobile switching centre server, in mobile telephony
 Mobile-satellite service, in telecommunications
 Monosulfide Solid Solution, a phase of paragenesis

Other uses 

 Mobutu Sese Seko, former leader of Zaire
 Modern Shetlandic Scots, a name for Shetland dialect used by some linguists
 Modular Sleep System, a US forces sleeping bag
 MSS or Mss., an abbreviation for manuscripts (handwritten documents)
 Movable scaffolding system, used for construction of concrete bridges
 M. S. Subbulakshmi, an Indian singer from Madurai